The 1938 Salvadoran Football Championship was the 6th season of the first division of Salvadoran football. Club Deportivo 33 was the season's champion, the club's second title.

Participating clubs

Tournament

Semifinals

Third-place match

Final

Bracket

References 

1938
1938 in association football